Little Cherrystone Creek is a  long 2nd order tributary to Cherrystone Creek in Pittsylvania County, Virginia. This is the only stream of this name in the United States.

Course 
Little Cherrystone Creek rises in a pond about 1 mile north of Chatham, Virginia and then flows southeast to join Cherrystone Creek about 2.5 miles southwest of Motleys Mill.

Watershed 
Little Cherrystone Creek drains  of area, receives about 45.6 in/year of precipitation, has a wetness index of 407.98, and is about 36% forested.

See also 
 List of Virginia Rivers

References 

Rivers of Virginia
Rivers of Pittsylvania County, Virginia
Tributaries of the Roanoke River